Chung Henry Ngolwe (born 21 November 1961) is a Zambian sprinter. He competed in the men's 100 metres at the 1984 Summer Olympics.

References

External links
 

1961 births
Living people
Athletes (track and field) at the 1984 Summer Olympics
Zambian male sprinters
Olympic athletes of Zambia
Athletes (track and field) at the 1982 Commonwealth Games
Commonwealth Games competitors for Zambia
Place of birth missing (living people)